The following is a list of highest waterfalls in India. It is based on the data from World Waterfall Database.
In many cases, numbers are merely estimates and measures may be imprecise. Highest waterfall in India is Kunchikal waterfall located in shimoga district of Karnataka.

References
4.The tallest waterfall in the india is Vajrai waterfall  and it's located in satara ,maharashtra 
 by height
 by height
Waterfalls by height